Mihran Ediki Harutyunyan (born 25 March 1989) is an Armenian-Russian Greco-Roman wrestler and mixed martial artist. He competed at the 2016 Summer Olympics for Armenia where in the final he lost to Davor Štefanek of Serbia. The decision is still considered to be very doubtful, and a lot of people signed petition to award gold medal to Harutyunyan. He is also a Russian national champion (2012) and runner-up (2011).

Mixed martial arts record

|-
| Win
| align=center| 4–1
| Akhmedkhan Akhmedov
| TKO (punches)
|EFC 35: Dakaev vs Abdurakov
|
|align=center|1
|align=center|3:17
|Moscow, Russia
| 
|-
| Loss
| align=center| 3–1
| Zhasulan Akimzhanov
| KO (spinning back kick)
| GFC 19: Krepost Selection 6
| 
| align=center| 3
| align=center| 4:48
| Sochi, Russia
| 
|-
| Win
| align=center| 3–0
| Muratkhan Saytkhanov
| Submission (guillotine choke)
| Krepost Fight Club: Selection 5
| 
| align=center| 1
| align=center| 1:17
| Moscow, Russia
|
|-
| Win
| align=center| 2–0
| Evgeny Perepechin
| TKO (punches)
| Battle on Volga 8
| 
| align=center| 1
| align=center| 4:50
| Samara, Russia
|
|-
| Win
| align=center| 1–0
| Ali Yousefi
| Submission (shoulder choke)
|Fight Nights Global 87: Khachatryan vs. Queally
|
| align=center| 2
| align=center| 0:47
|Rostov-on-Don, Russia
|

Personal life 
He is married and has a daughter named Monica. In 2020, following the outbreak of the Nagorno-Karabakh war, he volunteered to join the defense of Artsakh.

References

1989 births
Living people
Armenian male sport wrestlers
Armenian military personnel
European Games medalists in wrestling
European Games silver medalists for Armenia
Medalists at the 2016 Summer Olympics
Armenian military personnel of the 2020 Nagorno-Karabakh war
Olympic medalists in wrestling
Olympic silver medalists for Armenia
Olympic wrestlers of Armenia
People from Vagharshapat
Wrestlers at the 2015 European Games
Wrestlers at the 2016 Summer Olympics
Armenian male mixed martial artists
Mixed martial artists utilizing Greco-Roman wrestling
21st-century Armenian people
21st-century Russian people